Refugio State Beach (Chumash: Qasil, "Beautiful") is a protected state beach park in California, United States, approximately  west of Santa Barbara. During the summer months, the Junior Life Guard program resides at the beach during the day.

The Refugio oil spill occurred just north of the park in 2015 when a pipeline carrying crude oil ruptured. The spill went into a culvert that ran under US 101 and into the ocean. The parks were closed during the clean-up, including during the typically busy Memorial Day weekend. The pipeline which caused the disaster is no longer in service.

See also
List of beaches in California
List of California state parks

References

External links
"Refugio State Beach". California Department of Parks and Recreation. Retrieved April 27, 2017.

Beaches of Southern California
California State Beaches
Parks in Santa Barbara County, California
Beaches of Santa Barbara County, California